Loudi No. 2 High School, commonly abbreviated as (Loudi) Erzhong, is a public coeducational high school in Louxing District of Loudi, Hunan, China.

History
The school traces its origins to the former Middle School of Loudi Town, founded in 1959 and would later become the Lianyuan No. 10 High School. The school moved to its present  campus on Louxing South Road in Louxing District in 1979 and renamed "Loudi No. 2 High School".

Athletics
 Wrestling. In 2001, Yan Zhihui, a student from the school, won a gold medal at the World Youth Wrestling Championship in Australia.
 Track and field. In 1993, Shao Guangying, a student from the school, achieved 2 silver and 1 bronze medals at the World Track and Field Games for Middle School Students in Italy.

References

Educational institutions established in 1959
High schools in Loudi
1959 establishments in China